The Game of Life/Yahtzee/Payday is a traditional video game developed by American company Black Lantern Studios for the Game Boy Advance that includes versions of the games The Game of Life, Yahtzee and Pay Day. It was published by Destination Software Inc. in 2005 for the North American market and by Zoo Digital Publishing in 2006 for the European market.

Gameplay
In The Game of Life, you first start out, choosing either Career or College. The Career path will be much more easier than the College one.

References

2005 video games
Game Boy Advance games
Game Boy Advance-only games
Puzzle video games
Destination Software games
Video games developed in the United States
Black Lantern Studios games
Multiplayer and single-player video games